Fifteen ships of the Royal Navy have borne the name HMS Mary:

 was a Cinque Ports ship in service in 1350.
 was a ship in service from 1400 and given away in 1423.
 was a ship in service from 1413 and lost in 1426.
 was a Royalist ketch in 1648.  She was captured by the Parliamentarians in 1649 and not listed thereafter.
, commissioned as Speaker and renamed in 1660, was a 50-gun frigate, rebuilt in 1688, and wrecked in 1703, that was the prototype for the Speaker-class
 was a 4-gun fireship purchased in 1666 and sold in 1667.
 was a 4-gun fireship purchased in 1667 and expended that year.
 was an 8-gun yacht launched in 1677.  She was rebuilt in 1727 and 1761 and was broken up in 1816.
 was a 60-gun ship of the line built at Woolwich
 was a 10-gun ketch of unknown origin that foundered in 1694.
 was a 4-gun smack launched in 1702.  She was rebuilt in 1728 and lost in 1778.
 was a 60-gun fourth-rate ship of the line launched in 1704, rebuilt in 1742 and renamed HMS Princess Mary, and sold in 1766.
 was a gunvessel purchased in 1794 and sold in 1798.
 was a 6-gun tender purchased in 1797 and listed until 1805.
 was a 10-gun brig, the captured French Marie, renamed  in 1800 and sold in 1802.
 was a 3-gun schooner listed in 1812 and captured by the Americans in 1813.
 was a Coastguard cutter launched in 1867 and sold in 1905.

Ships that have used Mary in their names
 was a ship purchased in 1487, rebuilt in 1512 and listed until 1528.
 was a 4-gun bomb vessel purchased in 1694 and sold in 1698.
 was a 14-gun Irish Royalist ship captured in 1644 by the Parliamentarians and renamed Tiger’s Whelp in 1649, after which she was lost.
 was a ship captured from the French in 1415 but recaptured by them in 1421.
 was a ship captured in 1650 and sold in 1657.
 was a ship launched in 1497 and rebuilt in 1512 when she was renamed HMS Swallow.  She is listed until 1527.
 was the name of two ships.
 was a ship purchased in 1512 and listed until 1526.
 was a ship purchased in 1517 and listed until 1522.
 was the name of three ships.
 was a ship listed between 1524 and 1539.
 was a 70-gun ship purchased in 1544 and sold in 1555.
 was a carrack captured from the Genoese in 1416.  She foundered in 1420.
 was a ship listed between 1513 and 1525.
 was the name of two ships.
 was a ship listed in 1549.
 was a ship captured in 1545.  Her fate is unknown.
HMS Maryport was to have been a  minesweeper, but she was renamed  before her launch in 1918.
 was the name of three ships.
 was the name of nine ships, the first being the Tudor warship Mary Rose, now preserved at Portsmouth.
 was a ship captured in 1626 and listed until 1627.
 was a ship captured in 1545 and listed until 1546.
 was a  coastal minesweeper launched in 1958 and sold for scrapping in 1969.
 was a ship listed in 1535.  She was captured by the Scots in 1536, but recaptured in 1547.  She was rebuilt in 1551 and sold in 1573.

See also
  was an 8-gun royal yacht presented by the Dutch in 1660 and wrecked in 1675.
 
 
 Royal Mary, of the Royal Scots Navy, launched in 1696, transferred to the Royal Navy at the Union in 1707, when she was renamed , and sold in 1719
 His Majesty's Revenue cutter Mary. On 25 July 1797 she captured a small French privateer chasse maree off Ballycotton. The privateer was the Acheron, of 28 tons, out of Morlaix. Acheron was armed with one 8-pounder carronade and had a crew of 40 men. She had just arrived off Ballycotton but had already taken three vessels, which however the British had all recaptured. The Revenue brig Beresford arrived just as Mary took Acheron.

  was a  launched in 1940 and lent to the Royal Australian Navy in 1941.  She was sold into civilian service in 1947 and was renamed Isobel Queen.

References

Royal Navy ship names